Oregon Route 3 is a state highway in the U.S. state of Oregon. It is located entirely within Wallowa County.  OR 3 is the lowest numbered highway in the state of Oregon, of any type (state, federal, or Interstate).  OR 3 traverses the Enterprise–Lewiston Highway No. 11 of the Oregon state highway system.

Route description 
OR 3 has its southern terminus at a junction with Oregon Route 82 in the city of Enterprise.  It runs north/south, passing near the small community of Flora. It terminates at the Washington border.  The route continues north through Anatone and Asotin, Washington and into Clarkston, Washington as State Route 129.  From Clarkston, U.S. Route 12 provides direct access to Lewiston, Idaho.

History
An earlier routing passed through the community of Paradise, located east of the highway's current location. The highway was numbered to match Washington State Route 129, which had been a branch of Primary State Highway 3, and its predecessor State Road 3, from 1923 to 1964.

Major intersections

References

003
Transportation in Wallowa County, Oregon
Enterprise, Oregon
1932 establishments in Oregon